The Minneapolis, Northfield and Southern Railway  was an  long American shortline railroad connecting Minneapolis and Northfield, Minnesota. It was incorporated in 1918 to take over the trackage of the former Minneapolis, St. Paul, Rochester and Dubuque Electric Traction Company, also known as the Dan Patch Lines. On June 2, 1982, it was acquired by the Soo Line Railroad, which operated it as a separate railroad until merging it on January 1, 1986 along with the Chicago, Milwaukee, St. Paul and Pacific Railroad (Milwaukee Road).

The Dan Patch Lines 
Marion W. Savage, owner of the race horse Dan Patch, planned an electric railroad that would connect the Twin Cities to his farm and stables south of the Minnesota River. Savage purchased Dan Patch for $62,000 (a fortune in 1902), then lavishly promoted his equine protégé.

Savage and his backers chose 54th and Nicollet, at the time the Richfield-Minneapolis border, as the starting point for the new railroad. Minneapolis' Nicollet streetcar line ended at that spot, so passengers could easily transfer to the adjacent Dan Patch system. Its owners named their new firm the Minneapolis, St. Paul, Rochester and Dubuque Electric Traction Company, but no one used the full name. Instead, they preferred the nickname "Dan Patch Line." Construction began in 1908, eventually reaching Northfield in late 1910. Grading began on an extension to Faribault in 1911, but the company never secured an entrance into Faribault and abandoned the project.

The new railroad built four stations in Richfield, with platforms along the Nicollet Avenue corridor – on the Bachman's farmstead spur at 62nd, Goodspeed's farmstead at 66th, Irwin's farmstead on 72nd and Wilson's farmstead on the southwest corner of 78th. They also completed a company-developed picnic destination named Antlers Park, now part of the Lakeville city park system. Richfield gardeners and farmers used the Dan Patch railroad for shipping produce, dairy products and other goods. Passengers shared the platforms with farmers.

Original plans called for the Dan Patch Line to be electrified, but did not happen. The company used steam engines for their freight trains, while gas-electric locomotives and motorcars handled passenger traffic. Savage's penchant for first-class style did produce luxurious coaches – red, plush seat cushions and fringed shades on windows added a touch of Victorian elegance.

Management struggled to make the rail route profitable without consistent success. According to some reports, the railroad had an abysmal operating ratio of 147%. It persisted in operation until less than a week after the deaths of the horse Dan Patch and his owner Colonel Savage, it slumped into receivership on July 16, 1916.

Bankruptcy, receivership, and new ownership 
Four days after the bankruptcy, Charles P. Bratnober (president of the Minneapolis, Anoka and Cuyuna Range Railroad) was appointed receiver. The Minneapolis, Northfield and Southern Railroad, incorporated during June 1918 in South Dakota, bought the remnants of Savage's former company at foreclosure on August 6, 1918. The new owners promoted the Dan Patch's route from Northfield to Minneapolis, and successfully marketed the reconstituted railroad as a bridge line around the congested Twin Cities freight yards.

As finally constructed, the MN&S mainline ran in what is now the west metro of the Twin Cities. From its junction with the Minneapolis, St. Paul and Sault Ste. Marie Railroad at MNS Junction in Crystal, it traveled through New Hope, Golden Valley, St. Louis Park, Edina, Bloomington, Savage, Lakeville and down to Northfield. Along the way, the line connected the Soo Line with the Milwaukee Road, the Omaha Road, the Chicago Great Western and the Rock Island's St. Paul to Kansas City "Spine Line". They had shops at Glenwood on a spur line that went from the present area of Hwy 100 and Hwy 55 to the edge of downtown Minneapolis. Along that spur were connections to the Minneapolis and St. Louis Railway and Great Northern Railway. In addition, the original passenger "High Line" ran from Auto Club Junction in Bloomington through Richfield and into south Minneapolis, ending just north of the current Crosstown freeway.

Besides its freight service, the company continued passenger service using their gas-electric motorcars from Minneapolis to Antlers Park and Northfield until the 1940s. Until the Great Depression, the MN&S Ry. also used trackage rights on the Chicago Great Western from Northfield to Randolph and Mankato, and even after discontinuing passenger service maintained trackage rights to Randolph for freight service. Dan Patch's gas-electric locomotives were sold during bankruptcy, and freight was hauled by steam until the 1940s. Immediately after World War II, the MN&S began transitioning to diesel-electric locomotives such as the Baldwin DT-6-6-2000, then to various EMD models.

Sale to the Soo Line and current usage 

 
The railroad was purchased in 1982 by the Soo Line, and merged into the Soo Line in 1986. For decades prior to the sale to the Soo Line, the MN&S had a lucrative business interchanging with several Class I railroads. Rock Island and Milwaukee Road at Northfield, C&NW at Savage, Soo Line at Crystal, M&StL at St Louis Park, Great Northern at Cedar Lake Yard in Minneapolis, and CGW over trackage rights between Randolph and Northfield. By the time of the sale to Soo Line in 1982, MN&S's interchange business was in shambles with the Rock Island and Milwaukee Road fading in bankruptcy and the sale of CGW and M&StL to C&NW in the 1960s leaving only the Soo Line and Burlington Northern as viable interchange partners. The loss of interchange traffic at Randolph when CGW merged with C&NW in 1968 was a significant setback as C&NW already had its own routes to the Twin Cities and kept most of the ex-CGW inbound freight on its own rails. By 1982, the Soo Line was ready to make several moves and had sufficient funds to counter competing offers. Soo Line's grand plan was to secure MN&S to Northfield, then purchase the Spine Line to Kansas City from Rock Island in its liquidation. However, C&NW purchased the Spine Line for $93 million in 1983. The Soo Line saved face in 1985 by purchasing the bankrupt Milwaukee Road. The Soo Line's loss of the Spine Line and the transfer of southbound freight to the former Milwaukee Road route to Northfield reduced service on the entire MN&S for the next 25 years. By 1997, six years after the Soo Line was purchased by Canadian Pacific, the last train had gone between Lakeville and Savage, and the tracks have remained out-of-service since then. In 1999 the I&M Rail Link gained trackage rights on the former MN&S to Minneapolis but never utilized them. In 2004, during which Burnsville proposed reopening an at-grade crossing on the MN&S, Canadian Pacific stated that by the next five years Progressive Rail would be utilizing the MN&S route that is currently out-of-service, but this didn't happen. The Glenwood shops were closed and tracks removed in the mid 1980s after the Soo Line took over. Despite that, of the MN&S mainline extending south to Northfield, the Soo's owner Canadian Pacific Railway still owns the tracks from Savage to Lakeville and from the Minnesota River north to MNS Junction.

The Twin Cities and Western Railroad owns the Dan Patch Line Bridge over the Minnesota River. TC&W has trackage rights over the MN&S Spur and purchased the bridge to protect what they feel may become a valuable shipping route in the future.
In 2016, TC&W undertook a major rehabilitation of the Dan Patch Line Bridge in anticipation of an upsurge in grain traffic. Progressive Rail, Inc. owns the track between Lakeville and Northfield, operating it as their Jesse James Line. Progressive Rail owns and occasionally operates two MN&S cabooses as well as a former MN&S EMD SD39. Some of Progressive Rail's rolling stock is painted in an MN&S-inspired livery.

The Minnesota Department of Transportation has performed studies on operating commuter rail over the Dan Patch Line. While there is currently a circa 2002 legislative ban on state money going to further studies of the Dan Patch Corridor, bills have been introduced into the state legislature to reenact funding.

References

External links 

 Minnesota Statewide Historic Railways Study Project Report (pages 26 through 56 detail the historic significance of the MN&S)

Defunct Minnesota railroads
Transportation in Hennepin County, Minnesota
Richfield, Minnesota
Predecessors of the Canadian Pacific Railway
Railway companies established in 1918
Railway companies disestablished in 1986
Former Class I railroads in the United States
Interurban railways in Minnesota
American companies established in 1918